Muriwaimanu is an extinct genus of early penguin.

One species is known, Muriwaimanu tuatahi, which was originally referred to Waimanu tuatahi in 2006 by Slack et al.. It was discovered in the Waipara Greensand near the Waipara River, in Canterbury, New Zealand, in 1980. The name Muriwaimanu comes from muri, Māori for "after", and Waimanu, referring to the fact that the fossils come from younger strata than Waimanu. Species remains discovered in 2017 by Leigh Love exhibit a long, narrow beak and paddle-shaped wings. The fossilized remains also indicate  Muriwaimanu tuatahi may have kept their wings in a flexed position during downward strokes, unlike modern penguins whose wings are kept extended. They may be a transition species for modern Antarctic penguins.

See also
2018 in paleontology
Sequiwaimanu

References 

Extinct penguins
Paleocene first appearances
Fossil taxa described in 2018
Prehistoric bird genera